Yong Liu from the Fairchild Semiconductor Corporation, South Portland, Maine was named Fellow of the Institute of Electrical and Electronics Engineers (IEEE) in 2015 for contributions in power electronics packaging.

References

Fellow Members of the IEEE
Living people
Year of birth missing (living people)
Place of birth missing (living people)
American electrical engineers